Sphedanus is a genus of Asian nursery web spiders that was first described by Tamerlan Thorell in 1877.  it contains only three species, found only in Asia: S. banna, S. quadrimaculatus, and S. undatus.

See also
 List of Pisauridae species

References

Araneomorphae genera
Pisauridae
Spiders of Asia
Taxa named by Tamerlan Thorell